Sir Hugh Norman Annesley QPM (born 22 June 1939) is a retired Irish/British police officer. He served as Chief Constable of the Royal Ulster Constabulary from June 1989 to November 1996.

Annesley was born in Dublin and educated at St Andrew's Preparatory School and the Avoca School where he played for the field hockey team. He joined the London Metropolitan Police as a constable in 1958. Rising through the ranks to chief superintendent in 1974, he attended the Special Course (1963), Intermediate Command Course (1971) and Senior Command Course (1975) at the Police Staff College, Bramshill, before transferring to Sussex Police as Assistant Chief Constable (Personnel & Operations) in 1976. He attended the Royal College of Defence Studies in 1980 and the following year returned to the Metropolitan Police as Deputy Assistant Commissioner (Central & North West London). In 1983 he became Deputy Assistant Commissioner (Personnel) and in 1984 was director of the Force Re-organisation Team. 

Under the new organisational structure, in April 1985 he was appointed Assistant Commissioner Personnel and Training (ACPT) and in 1987 became Assistant Commissioner Specialist Operations (ACSO). In 1986 he had graduated from the FBI National Executive Institute in the United States. In 1989 he took up command of the RUC, despite the post being widely expected to go to Geoffrey Dear, and held the post until his retirement in 1996. 

Annesley was awarded the Queen's Police Medal (QPM) in the 1986 New Year Honours and was knighted in the 1992 New Year Honours.

Honours

Footnotes

References
Biography, Who's Who

External links
CAIN Web Service - Biographies of Prominent People - Annesley, Hugh Norman

|-

1939 births
Living people
People from Blackrock, Dublin
Chief Constables of the Royal Ulster Constabulary
Assistant Commissioners of Police of the Metropolis
Knights Bachelor
Metropolitan Police recipients of the Queen's Police Medal
Irish male field hockey players
Field hockey players from County Dublin